Joseph Thomas Evans (6 February 1906–1971) was an English footballer who played in the Football League for West Bromwich Albion.

References

1906 births
1971 deaths
English footballers
Association football midfielders
English Football League players
Darlaston Town (1874) F.C. players
West Bromwich Albion F.C. players